The Brooklyn Bridge is a hybrid cable-stayed/suspension bridge in New York City, spanning the East River between the boroughs of Manhattan and Brooklyn. Opened on May 24, 1883, the Brooklyn Bridge was the first fixed crossing of the East River. The span was originally called the New York and Brooklyn Bridge or the East River Bridge but was officially renamed the Brooklyn Bridge in 1915.

Proposals for a bridge connecting Manhattan and Brooklyn were first made in the early 19th century, which eventually led to the construction of the current span, designed by John A. Roebling. The project's chief engineer, his son Washington Roebling, contributed further design work, assisted by the latter's wife, Emily Warren Roebling. Construction started in 1870, with the Tammany Hall-controlled New York Bridge Company overseeing construction, although numerous controversies and the novelty of the design prolonged the project over thirteen years. Since opening, the Brooklyn Bridge has undergone several reconfigurations, having carried horse-drawn vehicles and elevated railway lines until 1950. To alleviate increasing traffic flows, additional bridges and tunnels were built across the East River. Following gradual deterioration, the Brooklyn Bridge has been renovated several times, including in the 1950s, 1980s, and 2010s.

The Brooklyn Bridge is the southernmost of the four toll-free vehicular bridges connecting Manhattan Island and Long Island, with the Manhattan Bridge, the Williamsburg Bridge, and the Queensboro Bridge to the north. Only passenger vehicles and pedestrian and bicycle traffic are permitted. A major tourist attraction since its opening, the Brooklyn Bridge has become an icon of New York City. Over the years, the bridge has been used as the location of various stunts and performances, as well as several crimes and attacks. The Brooklyn Bridge has been designated a National Historic Landmark, a New York City landmark, and a National Historic Civil Engineering Landmark.

Description  
The Brooklyn Bridge, an early example of a steel-wire suspension bridge, uses a hybrid cable-stayed/suspension bridge design, with both vertical and diagonal suspender cables. Its stone towers are neo-Gothic, with characteristic pointed arches. The New York City Department of Transportation (NYCDOT), which maintains the bridge, says that its original paint scheme was "Brooklyn Bridge Tan" and "Silver", although a writer for The New York Post states that it was originally entirely "Rawlins Red".

Deck 

To provide sufficient clearance for shipping in the East River, the Brooklyn Bridge incorporates long approach viaducts on either end to raise it from low ground on both shores.

Suspension span 
The bridge "elongates and contracts between the extremes of temperature from 14 to 16 inches". A 1909 Engineering Magazine article said that, at the center of the span, the height above MHW could fluctuate by more than  due to temperature and traffic loads, while more rigid spans had a lower maximum deflection.

At the time of construction, engineers had not yet discovered the aerodynamics of bridge construction, and bridge designs were not tested in wind tunnels. It was coincidental that the open truss structure supporting the deck is, by its nature, subject to fewer aerodynamic problems. This is because John Roebling designed the Brooklyn Bridge's truss system to be six to eight times as strong as he thought it needed to be. However, due to a supplier's fraudulent substitution of inferior-quality cable in the initial construction, the bridge was reappraised at the time as being only four times as strong as necessary.

These trusses are held up by suspender ropes, which hang downward from each of the four main cables. Crossbeams run between the trusses at the top, and diagonal and vertical stiffening beams run on the outside and inside of each roadway.

Here, the promenade rises to just above the level of the crossbeams, connecting to a balcony that slightly overhangs the two roadways. The iron railings were produced by Janes & Kirtland, a Bronx iron foundry that also made the United States Capitol dome and the Bow Bridge in Central Park.

Approaches 
Each of the side spans is reached by an approach ramp. The  approach ramp from the Brooklyn side is shorter than the  approach ramp from the Manhattan side. The approaches are supported by Renaissance-style arches made of masonry; the arch openings themselves were filled with brick walls, with small windows within. The approach ramp contains nine arch or iron-girder bridges across side streets in Manhattan and Brooklyn.

Underneath the Manhattan approach, a series of brick slopes or "banks" was developed into a skate park, the Brooklyn Banks, in the late 1980s. The park uses the approach's support pillars as obstacles. In the mid-2010s, the Brooklyn Banks were closed to the public because the area was being used as a storage site during the bridge's renovation. The skateboarding community has attempted to save the banks on multiple occasions; after the city destroyed the smaller banks in the 2000s, the city government agreed to keep the larger banks for skateboarding. When the NYCDOT removed the bricks from the banks in 2020, skateboarders started an online petition.

Cables 

The Brooklyn Bridge contains four main cables, which descend from the tops of the suspension towers and help support the deck. Two are located to the outside of the bridge's roadways, while two are in the median of the roadways. Each main cable measures  in diameter and contains 5,282 parallel, galvanized steel wires wrapped closely together in a cylindrical shape. These wires are bundled in 19 individual strands, with 278 wires to a strand. This was the first use of bundling in a suspension bridge and took several months for workers to tie together. Since the 2000s, the main cables have also supported a series of 24-watt LED lighting fixtures, referred to as "necklace lights" due to their shape.

In addition, 1,520 galvanized steel wire suspender cables hang downward from the main cables, and another 400 cable stays extend diagonally from the towers. These wires hold up the truss structure around the bridge deck.

Anchorages 

Each side of the bridge contains an anchorage for the main cables. Each anchorage weighs . The Manhattan anchorage rests on a foundation of bedrock while the Brooklyn anchorage rests on clay.

The anchorages both have four anchor plates, one for each of the main cables, which are located near ground level and parallel to the ground. The chains of eyebars curve downward from the cables toward the anchor plates, and the eyebars vary in size depending on their position.

The anchorages also contain numerous passageways and compartments. Starting in 1876, in order to fund the bridge's maintenance, the New York City government made the large vaults under the bridge's Manhattan anchorage available for rent, and they were in constant use during the early 20th century. The vaults were used to store wine, as they were kept at a consistent  temperature due to a lack of air circulation. The Manhattan vault was called the "Blue Grotto" because of a shrine to the Virgin Mary next to an opening at the entrance. The vaults were closed for public use in the late 1910s and 1920s during World War I and Prohibition but were reopened thereafter. When New York magazine visited one of the cellars in 1978, it discovered a "fading inscription" on a wall reading: "Who loveth not wine, women and song, he remaineth a fool his whole life long." Leaks found within the vault's spaces necessitated repairs during the late 1980s and early 1990s. By the late 1990s, the chambers were being used to store maintenance equipment.

Towers 

They are built of limestone, granite, and Rosendale cement. The limestone was quarried at the Clark Quarry in Essex County, New York. The granite blocks were quarried and shaped on Vinalhaven Island, Maine, under a contract with the Bodwell Granite Company, and delivered from Maine to New York by schooner. The Manhattan tower contains  of masonry, while the Brooklyn tower has  of masonry.

Each tower contains a pair of Gothic Revival pointed arches, through which the roadways run.

Caissons
The towers rest on underwater caissons made of southern yellow pine. Both caissons contain interior spaces that were used by construction workers. The caissons were designed to hold at least the weight of the towers which would exert a pressure of  when fully built, but the caissons were over-engineered for safety. Most of the timber used in the bridge's construction, including in the caissons, came from mills at Gascoigne Bluff on St. Simons Island, Georgia.

Ten more layers of timber were later added atop the ceiling, and the entire caisson was wrapped in tin and wood for further protection against flooding. The caisson had six chambers: two each for dredging, supply shafts, and airlocks.

The caisson on the Manhattan side was slightly different because it had to be installed at a greater depth. To protect against the increased air pressure at that depth, the Manhattan caisson had 22 layers of timber on its roof, seven more than its Brooklyn counterpart had. The Manhattan caisson also had fifty -diameter pipes for sand removal, a fireproof iron-boilerplate interior, and different airlocks and communication systems.

History

Planning 

Proposals for a bridge between the then-separate cities of Brooklyn and New York had been suggested as early as 1800. At the time, the only travel between the two cities was by a number of ferry lines. Engineers presented various designs, such as chain or link bridges, though these were never built because of the difficulties of constructing a high enough fixed-span bridge across the extremely busy East River. There were also proposals for tunnels under the East River, but these were considered prohibitively expensive. The current Brooklyn Bridge was conceived by German immigrant John Augustus Roebling in 1852. He had previously designed and constructed shorter suspension bridges, such as Roebling's Delaware Aqueduct in Lackawaxen, Pennsylvania, and the John A. Roebling Suspension Bridge between Cincinnati, Ohio, and Covington, Kentucky.

In February 1867, the New York State Senate passed a bill that allowed the construction of a suspension bridge from Brooklyn to Manhattan. Two months later, the New York and Brooklyn Bridge Company was incorporated with a board of directors (later converted to a board of trustees). There were twenty trustees in total: eight each appointed by the mayors of New York and Brooklyn, as well as the mayors of each city and the auditor and comptroller of Brooklyn. The company was tasked with constructing what was then known as the New York and Brooklyn Bridge. Alternatively, the span was just referred to as the "Brooklyn Bridge", a name originating in a January 25, 1867, letter to the editor sent to the Brooklyn Daily Eagle. The act of incorporation, which became law on April 16, 1867, authorized the cities of New York (now Manhattan) and Brooklyn to subscribe to $5 million in capital stock, which would fund the bridge's construction.

Roebling was subsequently named the main engineer of the work and, by September 1867, had presented a master plan. According to the plan, the bridge would be longer and taller than any suspension bridge previously built. It would incorporate roadways and elevated rail tracks, whose tolls and fares would provide the means to pay for the bridge's construction. It would also include a raised promenade that served as a leisurely pathway. The proposal received much acclaim in both cities, and residents predicted that the New York and Brooklyn Bridge's opening would have as much of an impact as the Suez Canal, the first transatlantic telegraph cable or the first transcontinental railroad. By early 1869, however, some individuals started to criticize the project, saying either that the bridge was too expensive, or that the construction process was too difficult.

To allay concerns about the design of the New York and Brooklyn Bridge, Roebling set up a "Bridge Party" in March 1869, where he invited engineers and members of U.S. Congress to see his other spans. Following the bridge party in April, Roebling and several engineers conducted final surveys. In June 1869, while conducting these surveys, Roebling sustained a crush injury to his foot when a ferry pinned it against a piling. After amputation of his crushed toes, he developed a tetanus infection that left him incapacitated and resulted in his death the following month. Washington Roebling, John Roebling's 32-year-old son, was then hired to fill his father's role. When the younger Roebling was hired, Tammany Hall leader William M. Tweed also became involved in the bridge's construction because, as a major landowner in New York City, he had an interest in the project's completion. The New York and Brooklyn Bridge Company—later known simply as the New York Bridge Company—was actually overseen by Tammany Hall, and it approved Roebling's plans and designated him as chief engineer of the project.

Construction

Caissons 

Construction of the Brooklyn Bridge began on January 2, 1870. The first work entailed the construction of two caissons, upon which the suspension towers would be built. The Brooklyn side's caisson was built at the Webb & Bell shipyard in Greenpoint, Brooklyn, and was launched into the river on March 19, 1870. Compressed air was pumped into the caisson, and workers entered the space to dig the sediment until it sank to the bedrock. As one sixteen-year-old from Ireland, Frank Harris, described the fearful experience:The six of us were working naked to the waist in the small iron chamber with the temperature of about 80 degrees Fahrenheit: In five minutes the sweat was pouring from us, and all the while we were standing in icy water that was only kept from rising by the terrific pressure. No wonder the headaches were blinding. Once the caisson had reached the desired depth, it was to be filled in with vertical brick piers and concrete. However, due to the unexpectedly high concentration of large boulders atop the riverbed, the Brooklyn caisson took several months to sink  to the desired depth. Furthermore, in December 1870, its timber roof caught fire, delaying construction further. The "Great Blowout", as the fire was called, delayed construction for several months, since the holes in the caisson had to be repaired. Overall, about 264 individuals were estimated to have worked in the caisson every day, but because of high worker turnover, the final total was thought to be about 2,500 men in total. In spite of this, only a few workers were paralyzed.

The Manhattan side's caisson was the next structure to be built. To ensure that it would not catch fire like its counterpart had, the Manhattan caisson was lined with fireproof plate iron. It was launched from Webb & Bell's shipyard on May 11, 1871, and maneuvered into place that September. Due to the extreme underwater air pressure inside the much deeper Manhattan caisson, many workers became sick with "the bends"—decompression sickness—during this work, despite the incorporation of airlocks (which were believed to help with decompression sickness at the time). This condition was unknown at the time and was first called "caisson disease" by the project physician, Andrew Smith. Between January 25 and May 31, 1872, Smith treated 110 cases of decompression sickness, while three workers died from the disease. When iron probes underneath the Manhattan caisson found the bedrock to be even deeper than expected, Washington Roebling halted construction due to the increased risk of decompression sickness.

Washington Roebling himself suffered a paralyzing injury as a result of caisson disease shortly after ground was broken for the Brooklyn tower foundation. His debilitating condition left him unable to supervise the construction in person, so he designed the caissons and other equipment from his apartment, directing "the completion of the bridge through a telescope from his bedroom." His wife, Emily Warren Roebling, not only provided written communications between her husband and the engineers on site, but also understood mathematics, calculations of catenary curves, strengths of materials, bridge specifications, and the intricacies of cable construction. She spent the next 11 years helping supervise the bridge's construction, taking over much of the chief engineer's duties, including day-to-day supervision and project management.

Towers 

After the caissons were completed, piers were constructed on top of each of them upon which masonry towers would be built. The towers' construction was a complex process that took four years. Since the masonry blocks were heavy, the builders transported them to the base of the towers using a pulley system with a continuous -diameter steel wire rope, operated by steam engines at ground level. The blocks were then carried up on a timber track alongside each tower and maneuvered into the proper position using a derrick atop the towers. The blocks sometimes vibrated the ropes because of their weight, but only once did a block  fall.

Construction on the suspension towers started in mid-1872, and by the time work was halted for the winter in late 1872, parts of each tower had already been built. By mid-1873, there was substantial progress on the towers' construction. The arches of the Brooklyn tower were completed by August 1874. The tower was substantially finished by December 1874 with the erection of saddle plates for the main cables at the top of the tower. However, the ornamentation on the Brooklyn tower could not be completed until the Manhattan tower was finished. The last stone on the Brooklyn tower was raised in June 1875 and the Manhattan tower was completed in July 1876. The saddle plates atop both towers were also raised in July 1876. The work was dangerous: by 1876, three workers had died having fallen from the towers, while nine other workers were killed in other accidents.

In 1875, while the towers were being constructed, the project had depleted its original $5 million budget. Two bridge commissioners, one each from Brooklyn and Manhattan, petitioned New York state lawmakers to allot another $8 million for construction. Ultimately, the legislators passed a law authorizing the allotment with the condition that the cities would buy the stock of Brooklyn Bridge's private stockholders.

Work proceeded concurrently on the anchorages on each side. The Brooklyn anchorage broke ground in January 1873 and was subsequently substantially completed in August 1875. The Manhattan anchorage was built in less time, having started in May 1875, it was mostly completed in July 1876. The anchorages could not be fully completed until the main cables were spun, at which point another  would be added to the height of each  anchorage.

Cables
The first temporary wire was stretched between the towers on August 15, 1876, using chrome steel provided by the Chrome Steel Company of Brooklyn. The wire was then stretched back across the river, and the two ends were spliced to form a traveler, a lengthy loop of wire connecting the towers, which was driven by a  steam hoisting engine at ground level. The wire was one of two that were used to create a temporary footbridge for workers while cable spinning was ongoing. The next step was to send an engineer across the completed traveler wire in a boatswain's chair slung from the wire, to ensure it was safe enough. The bridge's master mechanic, E.F. Farrington, was selected for this task, and an estimated crowd of 10,000 people on both shores watched him cross. A second traveler wire was then stretched across the span, a task that was completed by August 30.

By December 1876, a steel contract for the permanent cables still had not been awarded. There was disagreement over whether the bridge's cables should use the as-yet-untested Bessemer steel or the well-proven crucible steel. Until a permanent contract was awarded, the builders ordered  of wire in the interim, 10 tons each from three companies, including Washington Roebling's own steel mill in Brooklyn. In the end, it was decided to use number 8 Birmingham gauge (approximately 4 mm or 0.165 inches in diameter) crucible steel, and a request for bids was distributed, to which eight companies responded. In January 1877, a contract for crucible steel was awarded to J. Lloyd Haigh, who was associated with bridge trustee Abram Hewitt, whom Roebling distrusted.

The spinning of the wires required the manufacture of large coils of it which were galvanized but not oiled when they left the factory. The coils were delivered to a yard near the Brooklyn anchorage. There they were dipped in linseed oil, hoisted to the top of the anchorage, dried out and spliced into a single wire, and finally coated with red zinc for further galvanizing. There were thirty-two drums at the anchorage yard, eight for each of the four main cables. The first experimental wire for the main cables was stretched between the towers on May 29, 1877, and spinning began two weeks later. All four main cables were being strung by that July. During that time, the temporary footbridge was unofficially opened to members of the public, who could receive a visitor's pass; by August 1877 several thousand visitors from around the world had used the footbridge. The visitor passes ceased that September after a visitor had an epileptic seizure and nearly fell off.

As the wires were being spun, work also commenced on the demolition of buildings on either side of the river for the Brooklyn Bridge's approaches; this work was mostly complete by September 1877. The following month, initial contracts were awarded for the suspender wires, which would hang down from the main cables and support the deck. By May 1878, the main cables were more than two-thirds complete. However, the following month, one of the wires slipped, killing two people and injuring three others. In 1877, Hewitt wrote a letter urging against the use of Bessemer steel in the bridge's construction. Bids had been submitted for both crucible steel and Bessemer steel; John A. Roebling's Sons submitted the lowest bid for Bessemer steel, but at Hewitt's direction, the contract was awarded to Haigh.

A subsequent investigation discovered that Haigh had substituted inferior quality wire in the cables. Of eighty rings of wire that were tested, only five met standards, and it was estimated that Haigh had earned $300,000 from the deception. At this point, it was too late to replace the cables that had already been constructed. Roebling determined that the poorer wire would leave the bridge only four times as strong as necessary, rather than six to eight times as strong. The inferior-quality wire was allowed to remain and 150 extra wires were added to each cable. To avoid public controversy, Haigh was not fired, but instead was required to personally pay for higher-quality wire. The contract for the remaining wire was awarded to the John A. Roebling's Sons, and by October 5, 1878, the last of the main cables' wires went over the river.

Nearing completion 

After the suspender wires had been placed, workers began erecting steel crossbeams to support the roadway as part of the bridge's overall superstructure. Construction on the bridge's superstructure started in March 1879, but, as with the cables, the trustees initially disagreed on whether the steel superstructure should be made of Bessemer or crucible steel. The trustees later passed another resolution for another  of Bessemer steel. However, by February 1880 the steel deliveries had not started. That October, the bridge trustees questioned Edgemoor's president about the delay in steel deliveries. Despite Edgemoor's assurances that the contract would be fulfilled, the deliveries still had not been completed by November 1881. Brooklyn mayor Seth Low, who became part of the board of trustees in 1882, became the chairman of a committee tasked to investigate Edgemoor's failure to fulfill the contract. When questioned, Edgemoor's president stated that the delays were the fault of another contractor, the Cambria Iron Company, who was manufacturing the eyebars for the bridge trusses; at that point, the contract was supposed to be complete by October 1882.

Further complicating the situation, Washington Roebling had failed to appear at the trustees' meeting in June 1882, since he had gone to Newport, Rhode Island. After the news media discovered this, most of the newspapers called for Roebling to be fired as chief engineer, except for the Daily State Gazette of Trenton, New Jersey, and the Brooklyn Daily Eagle. Some of the longstanding trustees, including Henry C. Murphy, James S. T. Stranahan, and William C. Kingsley, were willing to vouch for Roebling, since construction progress on the Brooklyn Bridge was still ongoing. However, Roebling's behavior was considered suspect among the younger trustees who had joined the board more recently.

Construction on the bridge itself was noted in formal reports that Murphy presented each month to the mayors of New York and Brooklyn. For example, Murphy's report in August 1882 noted that the month's progress included 114 intermediate cords erected within a week, as well as 72 diagonal stays, 60 posts, and numerous floor beams, bridging trusses, and stay bars. By early 1883, the Brooklyn Bridge was considered mostly completed and was projected to open that June. Contracts for bridge lighting were awarded by February 1883, and a toll scheme was approved that March.

Opposition

There was substantial opposition to the bridge's construction from shipbuilders and merchants located to the north, who argued that the bridge would not provide sufficient clearance underneath for ships. In May 1876, these groups, led by Abraham Miller, filed a lawsuit in the United States District Court for the Southern District of New York against the cities of New York and Brooklyn.

In 1879, an Assembly Sub-Committee on Commerce and Navigation began an investigation into the Brooklyn Bridge. A seaman who had been hired to determine the height of the span, testified to the committee about the difficulties that ship masters would experience in bringing their ships under the bridge when it was completed. Another witness, Edward Wellman Serrell, a civil engineer, said that the calculations of the bridge's assumed strength were incorrect. The Supreme Court decided in 1883 that the Brooklyn Bridge was a lawful structure.

Opening 

The New York and Brooklyn Bridge was opened for use on May 24, 1883. Thousands of people attended the opening ceremony, and many ships were present in the East River for the occasion. Officially, Emily Warren Roebling was the first to cross the bridge. The bridge opening was also attended by U.S. president Chester A. Arthur and New York mayor Franklin Edson, who crossed the bridge and shook hands with Brooklyn mayor Seth Low at the Brooklyn end. Abram Hewitt gave the principal address.

Though Washington Roebling was unable to attend the ceremony (and rarely visited the site again), he held a celebratory banquet at his house on the day of the bridge opening. Further festivity included the performance by a band, gunfire from ships, and a fireworks display. On that first day, a total of 1,800 vehicles and 150,300 people crossed the span. Less than a week after the Brooklyn Bridge opened, ferry crews reported a sharp drop in patronage, while the bridge's toll operators were processing over a hundred people a minute. However, cross-river ferries continued to operate until 1942.

The bridge had cost  in 1883 dollars (about US$ in ) to build, of which Brooklyn paid two-thirds. The bonds to fund the construction would not be paid off until 1956. An estimated 27 men died during its construction. Since the New York and Brooklyn Bridge was the only bridge across the East River at that time, it was also called the East River Bridge.  Until the construction of the nearby Williamsburg Bridge in 1903, the New York and Brooklyn Bridge was the longest suspension bridge in the world,  20% longer than any built previously.

At the time of opening, the Brooklyn Bridge was not complete; the proposed public transit across the bridge was still being tested, while the Brooklyn approach was being completed. On May 30, 1883, six days after the opening, a woman falling down a stairway at the Brooklyn approach caused a stampede which resulted in at least twelve people being crushed and killed. In subsequent lawsuits, the Brooklyn Bridge Company was acquitted of negligence. However, the company did install emergency phone boxes and additional railings, and the trustees approved a fireproofing plan for the bridge. Public transit service began with the opening of the New York and Brooklyn Bridge Railway, a cable car service, on September 25, 1883. On May 17, 1884, one of the circus master P. T. Barnum's most famous attractions, Jumbo the elephant, led a parade of 21 elephants over the Brooklyn Bridge. This helped to lessen doubts about the bridge's stability while also promoting Barnum's circus.

Late 19th through early 20th centuries 

Patronage across the Brooklyn Bridge increased in the years after it opened; a million people paid to cross in the six first months. The bridge carried 8.5 million people in 1884, its first full year of operation; this number doubled to 17 million in 1885 and again to 34 million in 1889. Many of these people were cable car passengers. Additionally, about 4.5 million pedestrians a year were crossing the bridge for free by 1892.

The first proposal to make changes to the bridge was sent in only two and a half years after it opened, when Linda Gilbert suggested glass steam-powered elevators and an observatory be added to the bridge and a fee charged for use, which would in part fund the bridge's upkeep and in part fund her prison reform charity. This proposal was considered but not acted upon. Numerous other proposals were made during the first fifty years of the bridge's life.

Trolley tracks were added in the center lanes of both roadways in 1898, allowing trolleys to use the bridge as well. That year, the formerly separate City of Brooklyn was unified with New York City, and the Brooklyn Bridge fell under city control.

Concerns about the Brooklyn Bridge's safety were raised during the turn of the century. In 1898, traffic backups due to a dead horse caused one of the truss cords to buckle. There were more significant worries after twelve suspender cables snapped in 1901, though a thorough investigation found no other defects. After the 1901 incident, five inspectors were hired to examine the bridge each day, a service that cost $250,000 a year. The Brooklyn Rapid Transit Company, which operated routes across the Brooklyn Bridge, issued a notice in 1905 saying that the bridge had reached its transit capacity.

By 1890, due to the popularity of the Brooklyn Bridge, there were proposals to construct other bridges across the East River between Manhattan and Long Island. Although a second deck for the Brooklyn Bridge was proposed, it was thought to be infeasible because doing so would overload the bridge's structural capacity. The first new bridge across the East River, the Williamsburg Bridge, opened upstream in 1903 and connected Williamsburg, Brooklyn, with the Lower East Side of Manhattan. This was followed by the Queensboro Bridge between Queens and Manhattan in March 1909, and the Manhattan Bridge between Brooklyn and Manhattan in December 1909. Several subway, railroad, and road tunnels were also constructed, which helped to accelerate the development of Manhattan, Brooklyn, and Queens.

Though tolls had been instituted for carriages and cable-car customers since the bridge's opening, pedestrians were spared from the tolls originally. However, by the first decade of the 20th century, pedestrians were also paying tolls. Tolls on all four bridges across the East River—the Brooklyn Bridge, as well as the Manhattan, Williamsburg, and Queensboro bridges to the north—were abolished in July 1911 as part of a populist policy initiative headed by New York City mayor William Jay Gaynor. The city government passed a bill to officially name the structure the "Brooklyn Bridge" in January 1915. Ostensibly in an attempt to reduce traffic on nearby city streets, Grover Whalen, the commissioner of Plant and Structures, banned motor vehicles from the Brooklyn Bridge in 1922. The real reason for the ban was an incident the same year where two cables slipped due to high traffic loads. Both Whalen and Roebling called for the renovation of the Brooklyn Bridge and the construction of a parallel bridge, though the parallel bridge was never built.

Mid- to late 20th century

Upgrades 

The first major upgrade to the Brooklyn Bridge commenced in 1948, when a contract for redesigning the roadways were awarded to David B. Steinman. The renovation was expected to double the capacity of the bridge's roadways to nearly 6,000 cars per hour, at a projected cost of $7 million. The renovation included the demolition of both the elevated and the trolley tracks on the roadways, the removal of trusses separating the inner elevated tracks from the existing vehicle lanes and the widening of each roadway from two to three lanes, as well as the construction of a new steel-and-concrete floor. In addition, new ramps were added to Adams Street, Cadman Plaza, and the Brooklyn Queens Expressway (BQE) on the Brooklyn side, and to Park Row on the Manhattan side. The trolley tracks closed in March 1950 to allow for the widening work to occur. During the construction project, one roadway at a time was closed, allowing reduced traffic flows to cross the bridge in one direction only. The widened south roadway was completed in May 1951, followed by the north roadway in October 1953. The restoration was finished in May 1954 with the completion of the reconstructed elevated promenade.

While the rebuilding of the span was ongoing, a fallout shelter was constructed beneath the Manhattan approach in anticipation of the Cold War. The abandoned space in one of the masonry arches was stocked with emergency survival supplies for a potential nuclear attack by the Soviet Union; these supplies remained in place half a century later. In addition, defensive barriers were added to the bridge as a safeguard against sabotage.

Simultaneous with the rebuilding of the Brooklyn Bridge, a double-decked viaduct for the BQE was being built through an existing steel overpass of the bridge's Brooklyn approach ramp. The segment of the BQE from Brooklyn Bridge south to Atlantic Avenue opened in June 1954, but the direct ramp from the northbound BQE to the Manhattan-bound Brooklyn Bridge did not open until 1959. Subsequently, Boerum Place from Fulton Street south to Atlantic Avenue was also widened. This required the demolition of the old Kings County courthouse. The towers were cleaned in 1958 and the Brooklyn anchorage was repaired the next year.

On the Manhattan side, the city approved a controversial rebuilding of the Manhattan entrance plaza in 1953. The project, which would add a grade-separated junction over Park Row, was hotly contested because it would require the demolition of 21 structures, including the old New York World Building. The reconstruction also necessitated the relocation of 410 families on Park Row. In December 1956, the city started a two-year renovation of the plaza. This required the closure of one roadway at a time, as was done during the rebuilding of the bridge itself. Work on redeveloping the area around the Manhattan approach started in the mid-1960s. At the same time, plans were announced for direct ramps to the FDR Drive elevated highway to alleviate congestion at the approach. The ramp from the FDR Drive to the Brooklyn Bridge was opened in 1968, followed by the ramp from the bridge to the FDR Drive the next year. A single ramp from the Manhattan-bound Brooklyn Bridge to northbound Park Row was constructed in 1970. A repainting of the bridge was announced two years later in advance of its 90th anniversary.

Deterioration and late-20th century repair 

The Brooklyn Bridge gradually deteriorated due to age and neglect. While it had 200 full-time dedicated maintenance workers before World War II, that number dropped to five by the late 20th century, and the city as a whole only had 160 bridge maintenance workers. In 1974, heavy vehicles such as vans and buses were banned from the bridge to prevent further erosion of the concrete roadway. A report in The New York Times four years later noted that the cables were visibly fraying and the pedestrian promenade had holes in it. The city began planning to replace all the Brooklyn Bridge's cables at a cost of $115 million, as part of a larger project to renovate all four toll-free East River spans. By 1980, the Brooklyn Bridge was in such dire condition that it faced imminent closure. In some places, half of the strands in the cables were broken.

In June 1981, two of the diagonal stay cables snapped, seriously injuring a pedestrian who later died. Subsequently, the anchorages were found to have developed rust, and an emergency cable repair was necessitated less than a month later after another cable developed slack. Following the incident, the city accelerated the timetable of its proposed cable replacement, and it commenced a $153 million rehabilitation of the Brooklyn Bridge in advance of the 100th anniversary. As part of the project, the bridge's original suspender cables installed by J. Lloyd Haigh were replaced by Bethlehem Steel in 1986, marking the cables' first replacement since construction. In addition, the staircase at Washington Street in Brooklyn was renovated, the stairs from Tillary and Adams Streets were replaced with a ramp, and the short flights of steps from the promenade to each tower's balcony were removed. In a smaller project, the bridge was floodlit at night starting in 1982 to highlight its architectural features.

Additional problems persisted, and in 1993, high levels of lead were discovered near the bridge's towers. Further emergency repairs were undertaken in mid-1999 after small concrete shards began falling from the bridge into the East River. The concrete deck had been installed during the 1950s renovations and had a lifespan of about 60 years. The Park Row exit from the bridge's westbound lanes was closed as a safety measure after the September 11, 2001, attacks on the nearby World Trade Center. That section of Park Row had been closed off since it ran right underneath 1 Police Plaza, the headquarters of the New York City Police Department (NYPD). In early 2003, to save money on electricity, the NYCDOT turned off the bridge's "necklace lights" at night. They were turned back on later that year after several private entities made donations to fund the lights.

21st century 

After the 2007 collapse of the I-35W bridge in Minneapolis, public attention focused on the condition of bridges across the U.S. The New York Times reported that the Brooklyn Bridge approach ramps had received a "poor" rating during an inspection in 2007. However, a NYCDOT spokesman said that the poor rating did not indicate a dangerous state but rather implied it required renovation. In 2010, the NYCDOT began renovating the approaches and deck, as well as repainting the suspension span. Work included widening two approach ramps from one to two lanes by re-striping a new prefabricated ramp; raising clearance over the eastbound BQE at York Street; seismic retrofitting; replacement of rusted railings and safety barriers; and road deck resurfacing. The work necessitated detours for four years. At the time, the project was scheduled to be completed in 2014; but completion was later delayed to 2015, then again to 2017. The project's cost also increased from $508 million in 2010 to $811 million in 2016.

In August 2016, after the renovation had been completed, the NYCDOT announced that it would conduct a seven-month, $370,000 study to verify if the bridge could support a heavier upper deck that consisted of an expanded bicycle and pedestrian path. , about 10,000 pedestrians and 3,500 cyclists use the pathway on an average weekday. Work on the pedestrian entrance on the Brooklyn side was underway by 2017.

The NYCDOT also indicated in 2016 that it planned to reinforce the Brooklyn Bridge's foundations to prevent it from sinking, as well as repair the masonry arches on the approach ramps, which had been damaged by Hurricane Sandy in 2012. In July 2018, the New York City Landmarks Preservation Commission approved a further renovation of the Brooklyn Bridge's suspension towers and approach ramps. That December, the federal government gave the city $25 million in funding, which would pay for a $337 million rehabilitation of the bridge approaches and the suspension towers. Work started in late 2019 and was scheduled to be completed in 2023.

In early 2020, City Council speaker Corey Johnson and the nonprofit Van Alen Institute hosted an international contest to solicit plans for the redesign of the bridge's walkway. Ultimately, in January 2021, the city decided to install a two-way protected bike path on the Manhattan-bound roadway, replacing the leftmost vehicular lane. The bike lane would allow the existing promenade to be used exclusively by pedestrians. Work on the bike lane started in June 2021, and the new path was completed on September 14, 2021.

Usage

Vehicular traffic
Horse-drawn carriages have been allowed to use the Brooklyn Bridge's roadways since its opening. Originally, each of the two roadways carried two lanes of a different direction of traffic. In 1922, motor vehicles were banned from the bridge, while horse-drawn carriages were restricted from the Manhattan Bridge. Thereafter, the only vehicles allowed on the Brooklyn Bridge were horse-drawn.

After 1950, the main roadway carried six lanes of automobile traffic, three in each direction. It was then reduced to five lanes with the addition of a two-way bike lane on the Manhattan-bound side in 2021. Because of the roadway's height ( posted) and weight ( posted) restrictions, commercial vehicles and buses are prohibited from using the Brooklyn Bridge. The weight restrictions prohibit heavy passenger vehicles such as pickup trucks and SUVs from using the bridge, though this is not often enforced in practice.

On the Brooklyn side, vehicles can enter the bridge from Tillary/Adams Streets to the south, Sands/Pearl Streets to the west, and exit 28B of the eastbound Brooklyn-Queens Expressway. In Manhattan, cars can enter from both the northbound and southbound FDR Drive, as well as Park Row to the west, Chambers/Centre Streets to the north, and Pearl Street to the south. However, the exit from the bridge to northbound Park Row was closed after the September 11 attacks because of increased security concerns: that section of Park Row ran under One Police Plaza, the NYPD headquarters.

Exits and entrances
Vehicular access to the bridge is provided by a complex series of ramps on both sides of the bridge. There are two entrances to the bridge's pedestrian promenade on either side.

Rail traffic 
Formerly, rail traffic operated on the Brooklyn Bridge as well. Cable cars and elevated railroads used the bridge until 1944, while trolleys ran until 1950.

Cable cars and elevated railroads 

The New York and Brooklyn Bridge Railway, a cable car service, began operating on September 25, 1883; it ran on the inner lanes of the bridge, between terminals at the Manhattan and Brooklyn ends. Since Washington Roebling believed that steam locomotives would put excessive loads upon the structure of the Brooklyn Bridge, the cable car line was designed as a steam/cable-hauled hybrid. They were powered from a generating station under the Brooklyn approach. The cable cars could not only regulate their speed on the % upward and downward approaches, but also maintain a constant interval between each other. There were 24 cable cars in total.

Initially, the service ran with single-car trains, but patronage soon grew so much that by October 1883, two-car trains were in use. The line carried three million people in the first six months, nine million in 1884, and nearly 20 million in 1885 following the opening of the Brooklyn Union Elevated Railroad. Accordingly, the track layout was rearranged and more trains were ordered. At the same time, there were highly controversial plans to extend the elevated railroads onto the Brooklyn Bridge, under the pretext of extending the bridge itself. After disputes, the trustees agreed to build two elevated routes to the bridge on the Brooklyn side. Patronage continued to increase, and in 1888, the tracks were lengthened and even more cars were constructed to allow for four-car cable car trains. Electric wires for the trolleys were added by 1895, allowing for the potential future decommissioning of the steam/cable system. The terminals were rebuilt once more in July 1895, and, following the implementation of new electric cars in late 1896, the steam engines were dismantled and sold.

Following the unification of the cities of New York and Brooklyn in 1898, the New York and Brooklyn Bridge Railway ceased to be a separate entity that June and the Brooklyn Rapid Transit Company (BRT) assumed control of the line. The BRT started running through-services of elevated trains, which ran from Park Row Terminal in Manhattan to points in Brooklyn via the Sands Street station on the Brooklyn side. Before reaching Sands Street (at Tillary Street for Fulton Street Line trains, and at Bridge Street for Fifth Avenue Line and Myrtle Avenue Line trains), elevated trains bound for Manhattan were uncoupled from their steam locomotives. The elevated trains were then coupled to the cable cars, which would pull the passenger carriages across the bridge.

The BRT did not run any elevated train through services from 1899 to 1901. Due to increased patronage after the opening of the Interborough Rapid Transit Company (IRT)'s first subway line, the Park Row station was rebuilt in 1906. In the early 20th century, there were plans for Brooklyn Bridge elevated trains to run underground to the BRT's proposed Chambers Street station in Manhattan, though the connection was never opened. The overpass across William Street was closed in 1913 to make way for the proposed connection. In 1929, the overpass was reopened after it became clear that the connection would not be built.

After the IRT's Joralemon Street Tunnel and the Williamsburg Bridge tracks opened in 1908, the Brooklyn Bridge no longer held a monopoly on rail service between Manhattan and Brooklyn, and cable service ceased. New subway lines from the IRT and from the BRT's successor Brooklyn–Manhattan Transit Corporation (BMT), built in the 1910s and 1920s, posed significant competition to the Brooklyn Bridge rail services. With the opening of the Independent Subway System in 1932 and the subsequent unification of all three companies into a single entity in 1940, the elevated services started to decline, and the Park Row and Sands Street stations were greatly reduced in size. The Fifth Avenue and Fulton Street services across the Brooklyn Bridge were discontinued in 1940 and 1941 respectively, and the elevated tracks were abandoned permanently with the withdrawal of Myrtle Avenue services in 1944.

Trolleys 

A plan for trolley service across the Brooklyn Bridge was presented in 1895. Two years later, the Brooklyn Bridge trustees agreed to a plan where trolleys could run across the bridge under ten-year contracts. Trolley service, which began in 1898, ran on what are now the two middle lanes of each roadway (shared with other traffic). When cable service was withdrawn in 1908, the trolley tracks on the Brooklyn side were rebuilt to alleviate congestion. Trolley service on the middle lanes continued until the elevated lines stopped using the bridge in 1944, when they moved to the protected center tracks. On March 5, 1950, the streetcars also stopped running, and the bridge was redesigned exclusively for automobile traffic.

Walkway

Further exacerbating the situation, these "pinch points" are some of the most popular places to take pictures. As a result, in 2016, the NYCDOT announced that it planned to double the promenade's width.

A center line was painted to separate cyclists from pedestrians in 1971, creating one of the city's first dedicated bike lanes. Initially, the northern side of the promenade was used by pedestrians and the southern side by cyclists. In 2000, these were swapped, with cyclists taking the northern side and pedestrians taking the southern side. On September 14, 2021 the DOT closed off the inner-most car lane on the Manhattan-bound side with protective barriers and fencing to create a new bike path. Cyclists are now prohibited from the upper pedestrian lane.

Pedestrian access to the bridge from the Brooklyn side is from either the median of Adams Street at its intersection with Tillary Street or a staircase near Prospect Street between Cadman Plaza East and West. In Manhattan, the pedestrian walkway is accessible from crosswalks at the intersection of the bridge and Centre Street, or through a staircase leading to Park Row.

Emergency use
While the bridge has always permitted the passage of pedestrians, the promenade facilitates movement when other means of crossing the East River have become unavailable. During transit strikes by the Transport Workers Union in 1980 and 2005, people commuting to work used the bridge; they were joined by Mayors Ed Koch and Michael Bloomberg, who crossed as a gesture to the affected public. Pedestrians also walked across the bridge as an alternative to suspended subway services following the 1965, 1977, and 2003 blackouts, and after the September 11 attacks on the World Trade Center.

During the 2003 blackouts, many crossing the bridge reported a swaying motion. The higher-than-usual pedestrian load caused this swaying, which was amplified by the tendency of pedestrians to synchronize their footfalls with a sway. Several engineers expressed concern about how this would affect the bridge, although others noted that the bridge did withstand the event and that the redundancies in its design—the inclusion of the three support systems (suspension system, diagonal stay system, and stiffening truss)—make it "probably the best secured bridge against such movements going out of control". In designing the bridge, John Roebling had stated that the bridge would sag but not fall, even if one of these structural systems were to fail altogether.

Notable events

Stunts 

There have been several notable jumpers from the Brooklyn Bridge. The first person was Robert Emmet Odlum, brother of women's rights activist Charlotte Odlum Smith, on May 19, 1885. He struck the water at an angle and died shortly afterwards from internal injuries. Steve Brodie supposedly dropped from underneath the bridge in July 1886 and was briefly arrested for it, though there is some doubt about whether he actually jumped. Larry Donovan made a slightly higher jump from the railing a month afterward. The first person to jump from the bridge with the intention of suicide was Francis McCarey in 1892. A lesser known early jumper was James Duffy of County Cavan, Ireland, who on April 15, 1895, asked several men to watch him jump from the bridge. Duffy jumped and was not seen again. Additionally, the cartoonist Otto Eppers jumped and survived in 1910, and was then tried and acquitted for attempted suicide. The Brooklyn Bridge has since developed a reputation as a suicide bridge due to the number of jumpers who do so intending to kill themselves, though exact statistics are difficult to find.

Other notable feats have taken place on or near the bridge. In 1919, Giorgio Pessi piloted what was then one of the world's largest airplanes, the Caproni Ca.5, under the bridge. In 1993, bridge jumper Thierry Devaux illegally performed eight acrobatic bungee jumps above the East River close to the Brooklyn tower.

Crimes and terrorism 
On March 1, 1994, Lebanese-born Rashid Baz opened fire on a van carrying members of the Chabad-Lubavitch Orthodox Jewish Movement, striking 16-year-old student Ari Halberstam and three others traveling on the bridge. Halberstam died five days later from his wounds, and Baz was later convicted of murder. He was apparently acting out of revenge for the Hebron massacre of Palestinian Muslims a few days prior to the incident. After initially classifying the killing as one committed out of road rage, the Justice Department reclassified the case in 2000 as a terrorist attack. The entrance ramp to the bridge on the Manhattan side was subsequently dedicated as the Ari Halberstam Memorial Ramp.

Several potential attacks or disasters have also been averted. In 1979, police disarmed a stick of dynamite placed under the Brooklyn approach, and an artist in Manhattan was later arrested for the act. In 2003, truck driver Iyman Faris was sentenced to about 20 years in prison for providing material support to Al-Qaeda, after an earlier plot to destroy the bridge by cutting through its support wires with blowtorches was thwarted.

Arrests

At 9:00 a.m. on May 19, 1977, artist Jack Bashkow climbed one of the towers for Bridging, a "media sculpture" by the performance group Art Corporation of America Inc. Seven artists climbed the largest bridges connected to Manhattan "to replace violence and fear in mass media for one day". When each of the artists had reached the tops of the bridges, they ignited bright-yellow flares at the same moment, resulting in rush hour traffic disruption, media attention, and the arrest of the climbers, though the charges were later dropped. Called "the first social-sculpture to use mass-media as art” by conceptual artist Joseph Beuys, the event was on the cover of the New York Post, received international attention, and received ABC Eyewitness News' 1977 Best News of the Year award. John Halpern documented the incident in the film Bridging, 1977. Halpern attempted another "bridging" "social sculpture" in 1979, when he planted a radio receiver, gunpowder and fireworks in a bucket atop one of the towers. The piece was later discovered by police, leading to his arrest for possessing a bomb.

On October 1, 2011, more than 700 protesters with the Occupy Wall Street movement were arrested while attempting to march across the bridge on the roadway. Protesters disputed the police account of the events and claimed that the arrests were the result of being trapped on the bridge by the NYPD. The majority of the arrests were subsequently dismissed.

On July 22, 2014, the two American flags on the flagpoles atop each tower were found to have been replaced by bleached-white American flags. Initially, cannabis activism was suspected as a motive, but on August 12, 2014, two Berlin artists claimed responsibility for hoisting the two white flags, having switched out the original flags with their replicas. The artists said that the flags were meant to celebrate "the beauty of public space" and the anniversary of the death of German-born John Roebling, and they denied that it was an "anti-American statement".

Anniversary celebrations

The 50th-anniversary celebrations on May 24, 1933, included a ceremony featuring an airplane show, ships, and fireworks, as well as a banquet. During the centennial celebrations on May 24, 1983, President Ronald Reagan led a cavalcade of cars across the bridge. A flotilla of ships visited the harbor, officials held parades, and Grucci Fireworks held a fireworks display that evening. For the centennial, the Brooklyn Museum exhibited a selection of the original drawings made for the bridge's construction, including those by Washington Roebling. Media coverage of the centennial was declared "the public relations triumph of 1983" by Inc.

The 125th anniversary of the bridge's opening was celebrated by a five-day event on May 22–26, 2008, which included a live performance by the Brooklyn Philharmonic, a special lighting of the bridge's towers, and a fireworks display. Other events included a film series, historical walking tours, information tents, a series of lectures and readings, a bicycle tour of Brooklyn, a miniature golf course featuring Brooklyn icons, and other musical and dance performances. Just before the anniversary celebrations, artist Paul St George installed the Telectroscope, a video link on the Brooklyn side of the bridge that connected to a matching device on London's Tower Bridge. A renovated pedestrian connection to Dumbo, Brooklyn, was also reopened before the anniversary celebrations.

Impact 
At the time of construction, contemporaries marveled at what technology was capable of, and the bridge became a symbol of the era's optimism. John Perry Barlow wrote in the late 20th century of the "literal and genuinely religious leap of faith" embodied in the bridge's construction, saying that the "Brooklyn Bridge required of its builders faith in their ability to control technology".

Historical designations and plaques

The Brooklyn Bridge has been listed as a National Historic Landmark since January 29, 1964, and was subsequently added to the National Register of Historic Places on October 15, 1966. The bridge has also been a New York City designated landmark since August 24, 1967, and was designated a National Historic Civil Engineering Landmark in 1972. In addition, it was placed on UNESCO's list of tentative World Heritage Sites in 2017.

A bronze plaque is attached to the Manhattan anchorage, which was constructed on the site of the Samuel Osgood House at 1 Cherry Street in Manhattan. Named after Samuel Osgood, a Massachusetts politician and lawyer, it was built in 1770 and served as the first U.S. presidential mansion. The Osgood House was demolished in 1856.

Another plaque on the Manhattan side of the pedestrian promenade, installed by the city in 1975, indicates the bridge's status as a city landmark.

Culture
The Brooklyn Bridge has had an impact on idiomatic American English. For example, references to "selling the Brooklyn Bridge" abound in American culture, sometimes as examples of rural gullibility but more often in connection with an idea that strains credulity. George C. Parker and William McCloundy were two early 20th-century con men who may have perpetrated this scam successfully on unwitting tourists, although the author of The Brooklyn Bridge: A Cultural History wrote, "No evidence exists that the bridge has ever been sold to a 'gullible outlander'".

As a tourist attraction, the Brooklyn Bridge is a popular site for clusters of love locks, wherein a couple inscribes a date and their initials onto a lock, attach it to the bridge, and throw the key into the water as a sign of their love. The practice is officially illegal in New York City and the NYPD can give violators a $100 fine. NYCDOT workers periodically remove the love locks from the bridge at a cost of $100,000 per year.

To highlight the Brooklyn Bridge's cultural status, the city proposed building a Brooklyn Bridge museum near the bridge's Brooklyn end in the 1970s. Though the museum was ultimately not constructed, the plans had been established after numerous original planning documents were found in Williamsburg. These documents were given to the New York City Municipal Archives, where they are normally located, though the documents were briefly displayed at the Whitney Museum of American Art in 1976.

Media

The bridge is often featured in wide shots of the New York City skyline in television and film and has been depicted in numerous works of art. Fictional works have used the Brooklyn Bridge as a setting; for instance, the dedication of a portion of the bridge, and the bridge itself, were key components in the 2001 film Kate & Leopold. Furthermore, the Brooklyn Bridge has also served as an icon of America, with mentions in numerous songs, books, and poems. Among the most notable of these works is that of American Modernist poet Hart Crane, who used the Brooklyn Bridge as a central metaphor and organizing structure for his second book of poetry, The Bridge (1930).

The Brooklyn Bridge has also been lauded for its architecture. One of the first positive reviews was "The Bridge As A Monument", a Harper's Weekly piece written by architecture critic Montgomery Schuyler and published a week after the bridge's opening. In the piece, Schuyler wrote: "It so happens that the work which is likely to be our most durable monument, and to convey some knowledge of us to the most remote posterity, is a work of bare utility; not a shrine, not a fortress, not a palace, but a bridge." Architecture critic Lewis Mumford cited the piece as the impetus for serious architectural criticism in the U.S. He wrote that in the 1920s the bridge was a source of "joy and inspiration" in his childhood, and that it was a profound influence in his adolescence. Later critics would regard the Brooklyn Bridge as a work of art, as opposed to an engineering feat or a means of transport. Not all critics appreciated the bridge, however. Henry James, writing in the early 20th century, cited the bridge as an ominous symbol of the city's transformation into a "steel-souled machine room".

The construction of the Brooklyn Bridge is detailed in numerous media sources, including David McCullough's 1972 book The Great Bridge and Ken Burns's 1981 documentary Brooklyn Bridge. It is also described in Seven Wonders of the Industrial World, a BBC docudrama series with an accompanying book, as well as Chief Engineer: Washington Roebling, The Man Who Built the Brooklyn Bridge, a biography published in 2017.

See also 
 Brooklyn Bridge Park
 Brooklyn Bridge trolleys
 List of tallest structures built before the 20th century

References

Notes

Citations

Bibliography

External links 

 Brooklyn Bridge – New York City Department of Transportation
 
 
 Brooklyn Bridge at Historical Marker Database
 

Wikisource items:

 
 

 
1883 establishments in New York (state)
Bike paths in New York City
Bridges completed in 1883
Bridges in Brooklyn
Bridges in Manhattan
Bridges on the National Register of Historic Places in New York City
Bridges over the East River
Brooklyn Heights
Brooklyn–Manhattan Transit Corporation
Civic Center, Manhattan
Former railway bridges in the United States
Historic American Engineering Record in New York City
Historic Civil Engineering Landmarks
National Historic Landmarks in New York City
National Register of Historic Places in Brooklyn
National Register of Historic Places in Manhattan
New York City Designated Landmarks in Brooklyn
New York City Designated Landmarks in Manhattan
Pedestrian bridges in New York City
Railroad bridges in New York City
Railroad bridges on the National Register of Historic Places in New York City
Railroad-related National Historic Landmarks
Road bridges in New York City
Road bridges on the National Register of Historic Places in New York City
Road-rail bridges in the United States
Steel bridges in the United States
Stone bridges in the United States
Suspension bridges in New York City
Symbols of New York City
Tourist attractions in Brooklyn
Tourist attractions in Manhattan
Dumbo, Brooklyn